The Karshi Challenger is a tennis tournament held in Qarshi, Uzbekistan since 2007. The event is part of the ATP Challenger Tour and is played on outdoor hard courts.

Past finals

Singles

Doubles

External links
Official website

 
ATP Challenger Tour
Hard court tennis tournaments
Recurring sporting events established in 2007
2007 establishments in Uzbekistan
Tennis tournaments in Uzbekistan